Peter Kariuki Ngumi (born 16 July 1977) is a Kenyan boxer. He competed in the men's middleweight event at the 2000 Summer Olympics.

References

1977 births
Living people
Kenyan male boxers
Olympic boxers of Kenya
Boxers at the 2000 Summer Olympics
Sportspeople from Nairobi
African Games medalists in boxing
Middleweight boxers
African Games bronze medalists for Kenya
Competitors at the 1999 All-Africa Games
21st-century Kenyan people
20th-century Kenyan people